Patrick McGuirk (born July 22, 1967) is a former American football defensive back who played eight professional seasons in the Arena Football League (AFL), World League of American Football (WLAF) and the National Football League (NFL). McGuirk played 5 season in the AFL with the Fort Worth Cavalry and San Jose SaberCats. He first enrolled at the College of San Mateo before transferring to California Polytechnic State University. He was also a member of the Winnipeg Blue Bombers, Raleigh-Durham Skyhawks, Frankfurt Galaxy and San Francisco 49ers.

College career
McGuirk first played college football for the San Mateo Bulldogs of the College of San Mateo from 1986 to 1987. In 1987, he earned All-Golden Gate Conference and team MVP honors leading the team & conference with 7 interceptions. He earned scholarship to play for the Cal Poly Mustangs. 1988/1989 - McGuirk recorded 42 tackles, 12 pass breakups and 2 interceptions for the Mustangs.

Professional career
McGuirk signed with the Winnipeg Blue Bombers of the Canadian Football League in 1990. He was drafted by the Raleigh-Durham Skyhawks of the World League of American Football (WLAF) in the eighth round with the 75th pick in the 1991 WLAF Draft. He led the Skyhawks & tied for  3rd in the league w 6 interceptions, 37 tackles (30 solo) &  3 fumble recoveries and led team with 9 pass breakups. 
1992 - He was selected by the Frankfurt Galaxy of the WLAF in the fifth round of the 1992 WLAF Draft. He led the team with 10 pass breakups. 
1994 - McGuirk played for the AFL's Fort Worth Cavalry. He recorded 54 tackles, established Arena League Record with 21 pass break ups, 2 forced fumbles and 5 interceptions for the Cavalry. 
1995 - McGuirk was traded to the San Jose Sabercats of the Arena Football League. He made the All Arena Football League 1st Team ....Led the league with 9 interceptions...Broke the ARENA FOOTBALL LEAGUE RECORD for longest interception return (52 yards/TD)....Broke the AFL RECORD for most interception return yards in a game (62)...Broke the AFL RECORD for most interception return yards in a season (202)...Set a TEAM RECORD with 4 passes defensed at Las Vegas (5/19)... Tied an AFL RECORD with 21 passes defensed...Set a TEAM RECORD with 3 interceptions vs. Charlotte (7/14)...Led team with 57 tackles.
1996 -  McGuirk earned his second straight First-team All-Arena honors...Led the Sabercats with 7 interceptions, 18 passes defensed and 56 tackles. 
1997 -  McGuirk led Sabercats with 52 tackles, 5 pass breakups and 3 interceptions...
1998 - McGuirk led Sabercats with 62 tackles, career high 22 pass breakups and 5 interceptions.

1995 - NFL  -  McGuirk was a member of the practice squad of the San Francisco 49ers of the National Football League. McGuirk was released by the 49ers in October 1995.

1996 - NFL - McGuirk spent time with the San Francisco 49ers. Appearing in final 2 preseason games against Jacksonville Jaguars and Seattle Seahawks accumulating five tackles...appeared mainly on special teams where McGuirk would start both contests...also saw action at cornerback...Signed to the practice squad in September.

References

External links
Just Sports Stats

Living people
1967 births
American football defensive backs
Canadian football defensive backs
American players of Canadian football
San Mateo Bulldogs football players
Cal Poly Mustangs football players
Winnipeg Blue Bombers players
Raleigh–Durham Skyhawks players
Frankfurt Galaxy players
Fort Worth Cavalry players
San Francisco 49ers players
San Jose SaberCats players
Players of American football from San Francisco
Players of Canadian football from San Francisco